Filipinos in Indonesia were estimated to number 7,400 individuals as of 2022, according to the statistics of the Philippine government. Most are based in Jakarta, though there is also a community in Surabaya and other major cities in Indonesia. This represented growth of nearly five times over the government's 1998 estimate of 1,046 individuals.

Employment
Unlike many other overseas Filipino communities, Filipinos in Indonesia consist largely of skilled professionals, especially in the advertising industries and as teachers in international schools where their English skills are most needed. 20% also work in finance, especially as accountants.

Some Filipinos also work as fisherman on Indonesian waters. However, some have fished illegally and have faced a crackdown with the consequence of deportation by Indonesian authorities.

Inter-ethnic relations
Filipinos in Indonesia generally maintain good interethnic relations with their Indonesian neighbours, with whom they feel culturally closer than Europeans or Americans; Indonesians stereotype Filipinos as being gregarious and cheerful. However, there are fears that Filipinos in Indonesia may become the targets of kidnappings by local militant groups such as Jemaah Islamiyah in an attempt to secure the release of JI members imprisoned in Philippine jails.

Community
Filipinos in Indonesia have formed eight different community associations, including three sports teams, one teachers' association, and two Christian groups. The annual Philippine Independence Day celebrations attract numerous participants.

See also
 Indonesians in the Philippines
 Indonesia–Philippines relations

References

External links
 Dahil Sa'Yo, a publication aimed at Filipinos in Indonesia

Indonesia
Indonesia
Immigration to Indonesia
Expatriates in Indonesia
Indonesia–Philippines relations